Sarah Stroumsa (1950) is the Alice and Jack Ormut Professor of Arabic Studies at the Hebrew University of Jerusalem.  She has contributed several investigations into Jewish and Arabic scholastic philosophy.
In 2021 she was elected to the American Philosophical Society.

Career
After earning her B.A, Stroumsa joined the faculty at The Hebrew University of Jerusalem in 1977. By 1999, she was appointed to Full professor and later sat as Vice-Rector of the University from 2003 until 2006.

In 2003, she was named the Alice and Jack Ormut Professor Emerita of Arabic Studies at the Hebrew University of Jerusalem. A few years later, she became the first woman to serve as Rector of the Hebrew University. The year after her promotion, 
Stroumsa was the recipient of the Italian Solidarity Award. During her tenure as Rector, The Hebrew University of Jerusalem jumped from 72nd to 57th on the World Universities Ranking list. She also helped establish the University's first Muslim prayer room.

After ending her tenure as Rector, she was the recipient of a Research Grant from the Alexander von Humboldt Foundation for a Research Project at Freie Universität Berlin. In 2018, Stroumsa and her husband earned the 2018 Leopold Lucas Prize.

Personal life
Stroumsa is married to Guy Stroumsa and they have two daughters.

Published Work 

Regarding Maimonides, she insists that Leo Strauss's 'dichotomy of esoteric versus exoteric writing does not do justice to Maimonides’ context-sensitive rhetoric,’ claiming instead that he "‘plays a double game’, reconciling and integrating dualities through the constant, creative interplay between Arabic and Hebrew, Islamic and Jewish culture."

 
 Sarah Stroumsa, Dawud ibn Marwan al-Muqammis's 'Ishrun Maqala (Etudes sur le judaisme medieval XIII, Leiden: Brill, 1989)

References 

Living people
People from Haifa
Academic staff of the Hebrew University of Jerusalem
Hebrew University of Jerusalem alumni
Israeli women academics
1950 births
Members of the American Philosophical Society